Carmyllie railway station served the town of Carmyllie, Angus, Scotland from 1900 to 1965 on the Carmyllie Railway.

History 
The station opened on 1 February 1900 by the North British Railway. It was the northern terminus of the line. To the north west of the level crossing was a siding that existed before the station opened. The station closed to passengers on 2 December 1929 and to goods traffic on 26 May 1965.

References

External links 

Disused railway stations in Angus, Scotland
Former Dundee and Arbroath Railway stations
Railway stations in Great Britain opened in 1900
Railway stations in Great Britain closed in 1965
1900 establishments in Scotland
1965 disestablishments in Scotland